Alcazaba, alcáçova or alcassaba is a Moorish fortification in Spain and Portugal. The word derives from the Arabic word القصبة (al-qasbah), a walled-fortification in a city. It is also the name of a mountain peak in Spain. It may refer to:

Architecture
 Alcazaba, a walled-fortification in a city
 Alcazaba of Almería
 Alcazaba of Antequera
 Alcazaba of Badajoz
 Alcazaba of Málaga
 Alcazaba of Mérida
 Alcazaba of the Alhambra

Geographic locations
 Alcazaba (Sierra Nevada), a 3371-meter high mountain in Spain's Sierra Nevada range and the third highest peak in that range